Jorge Antonio Ruvalcaba Castro (born 23 July 2001) is a professional footballer who plays as a winger for Liga MX club UNAM. Born in the United States, he represented the Mexico national under-21 team.

Club career
In 2019, Ruvalcaba almost joined the youth academy of Spanish La Liga side Leganés. In 2020, he signed for Cal State San Bernardino Coyotes in the United States. After playing collegiately at Cal State San Bernardino, Ruvalcaba joined amateur side Ocelot Academy playing in the United Premier Soccer League. In 2021, he signed for Mexican top flight club Pumas. On 11 January 2022, Ruvalcaba debuted for Pumas during a 5-0 win over Toluca, in which he scored his first professional goal.

International career
Born in the United States, Ruvalcaba was included in the under-21 roster that participated in the 2022 Maurice Revello Tournament, scoring one goal, Mexico finished third.

Career statistics

Club

References
nosoccer

External links
 

2001 births
Living people
Sportspeople from Rialto, California
Mexico youth international footballers
Mexican footballers
American soccer players
American sportspeople of Mexican descent
Association football midfielders
Club Universidad Nacional footballers
Liga MX players
Soccer players from California
United Premier Soccer League players
Cal State San Bernardino Coyotes men's soccer players